The name Adriane may refer to:
Adriane Carr (born 1952), Canadian academic, activist, and politician
Adriane dos Santos  (born 1988), Brazilian association football player
Adriane Fugh-Berman, American medical researcher
Adriane Lenox (born 1956), American stage and film actress
Adriane Galisteu (born 1973), Brazilian model, actress, and TV Host
Adriane Garcia (born 1983), TV show presenter, actress and former pop singer-songwriter now living in Portugal
Adriane Johnson, American politician
Adriane Lenox, American actress
Adriane Rini, New Zealand philosopher

See also
ADRIANE, acronym of Audio Desktop Reference Implementation and Networking Environment, a variety of the Knoppix Linux distribution
 Ariadne (disambiguation)